León David Najnudel (14 July 1941 – 22 April 1998) was an Argentine professional basketball player and basketball coach, and the main driving force in the creation of the Liga Nacional de Básquet, the first nationwide yearly professional basketball league in Argentina.

Playing career

Najnudel played for Villa Crespo, Victoria, Barracas Juniors and Atlanta.

Coaching career
Atlanta: 1963–1971
Corrientes Province youth team: 1971–1975
Ferro Carril Oeste: 1976–1982
CB Zaragoza (Spain): 1983–1984
Argentina national basketball team: 1985
Sport Club Cañadense: 1986–1988
Ferro Carril Oeste: 1988–1990
Deportivo San Andrés: 1991
Gimnasia y Esgrima de Comodoro Rivadavia: 1992–1993
Boca Juniors: 1994–1995
Racing Club: 1995
Ferro Carril Oeste: 1996

Honours
Ferro Carril Oeste
Campeonato Sudamericano de Clubes: 1981, 1982
Liga Nacional de Básquet: 1989
CB Zaragoza
Copa del Rey de Baloncesto: 1983

Stats
League games: 448 games with 241 wins and 207 losses. (53,80%)
Regular Series: 388 games with 207 wins and 181 losses. (53.35%)
Post-Season: 60 games with 34 wins and 26 losses. (56.66%)

Liga Nacional de Básquet
Najnudel, along coaches José María Cavallero and Horacio Seguí, as well as journalist Osvaldo Ricardo Orcasitas, were the main proponents of the creation of the Liga Nacional de Básquet. The goal was finally achieved on 26 April 1985, when the first game of the league was played.

The new nationwide league allowed basketball to grow in cities other than Buenos Aires, like in Bahía Blanca and Córdoba, that became important basketball centers.

Death

Najnudel died of leukemia in 1998.

References

1941 births
1998 deaths
Argentine men's basketball players
Basketball players from Buenos Aires
Argentine basketball coaches
Jewish Argentine sportspeople
Argentine expatriate sportspeople in Spain
Deaths from leukemia
CB Zaragoza players